Claudia Angela Gamon (born 23 December 1988) is an Austrian politician and former student union functionary who was elected as a Member of the European Parliament in 2019. Gamon has been a member of the National Council of Austria since October 2015.

Background  
Gamon was born in Feldkirch and raised in Nenzing. After her 2007 graduation from Bundesgymnasium Bludenz,
she received her bachelor's degree in International Business Administration from Vienna University of Economics and Business in 2011. From 2011 until 2015, she had her master studies at the Vienna University of Economics and Business.

From 2010 to 2013, Claudia Gamon was responsible for marketing and sales in her parents' wine business. From June 2013 she worked in various positions at the federal party of NEOS, among other things as assistant to the campaign manager and the federal managing director as well as responsible for communication and press. From January to August 2015, Gamon worked in project management at ÖAMTC (de) before being in the National Council.

Politics

Student union 
In the 2011 Austrian Students' Association election, Gamon became Austria's top candidate for JuLis (now JUNOS – Young liberal NEOS) and was first sent as a mandatary to the student body She also returned in 2013.

Federal politics 
From 2011, Gamon was involved as a co-initiator of the initiative against church privileges (de). With the founding of NEOS – The New Austria and Liberal Forum in October 2012, she focused her political work there.

In the 2013 Austrian legislative election, Claudia Gamon joined NEOS in the Wien Innen-Ost regional constituency (de) as a top candidate and was placed on the Vienna state list (4th place) and the NEOS federal list (6th place) relatively far ahead.

After Beate Meinl-Reisinger announced her resignation from the National Council on September 24, 2015, Claudia Gamon was designated as her successor by NEOS. Since 12 October 2015 Gamon has been the party's youngest member of the National Council.

In the 25th National Council, Gamon is Area Spokesperson for the NEOS-Club for Science and Research, Court of Auditors, Women, Youth and Sport. She is a member of the National Council Committees for Research, Innovation and Technology, Sport, the Court of Auditors, the Standing Subcommittee of the Court of Auditors and the Scientific Committee. In 2017, Gamon filled Niko Alm's (de) vacancy in the Wien provincial constituency (de). Gamon was re-elected in the NEOS party list in 2017.

Member of the European Parliament 
In December 2018, Gamon announced via Instagram that she would be a NEOS candidate for the 2019 European Parliament election. She wanted a "strong Europe" that joins forces to make decisions and is "successful, recognized, peaceful and prosperous". On 26 January 2019, Gamon was nominated at the NEOS-meeting as the party's top candidate.

Since 2021, Gamon has been part of the Parliament's delegation to the Conference on the Future of Europe.

In addition to her committee assignments, Gamon is part of the Spinelli Group, the MEPs Against Cancer group, the European Parliament Intergroup on Small and Medium-Sized Enterprises (SMEs) and the European Parliament Intergroup on Disability.

References

External links 

 
 Claudia Gamon auf www.meineabgeordneten.at.

Living people
1988 births
Members of the National Council (Austria)
Vienna University of Economics and Business alumni
MEPs for Austria 2019–2024
NEOS – The New Austria MEPs
NEOS – The New Austria politicians
21st-century women MEPs for Austria